Jingmai Kathleen O'Connor (born August 26, 1983) is a paleontologist who works as a curator at the Field Museum.

Biography
O'Connor is from Pasadena, California. Her mother is a geologist. O'Connor says that while she was not a dinosaur enthusiast as a child, being present for her mother's geology fieldwork began her interest in the subject. She explains, "I enjoyed going to the field with her, collecting rocks, minerals, and fossils, and playing in the lab."

O'Connor graduated from Occidental College after majoring in Geology and studying with Donald Prothero. While a student, she volunteered in the paleontology department of the Natural History Museum of Los Angeles County, working with Xiaoming Wang.  She received a Ph.D. from the University of Southern California in 2009, studying ancient birds with Luis M. Chiappe and Dr. David Bottjer.

Paleontology
After obtaining her Ph.D., O'Connor moved to Beijing where she worked as a postdoc at the Institute of Vertebrate Paleontology and Paleoanthropology. Working with Zhou Zhonghe, she advanced to a full professorship while continuing her ancient bird research. Professor O'Connor is half Chinese and says that she is "very, very proud and fascinated by my Chinese culture" and found moving to China to pursue paleontology very rewarding.

In 2011, O'Connor named a species of Qiliania, a Cretaceous-era bird that she discovered with a team, the Qiliania graffini after Greg Graffin. Graffin is most well-known as the singer of the punk band Bad Religion and is also a professor of Evolutionary biology.

During her time with the Institute, O'Connor was part of a team that made discoveries of extraordinary Enantiornithes remains preserved in Burmese amber. These deposits dated to 99 million years ago and the remains are among the most well-preserved of any Mesozoic dinosaur. The team found fully feathered wings, feet, and even entire hatchlings. With the team, and also as first author, Prof. O'Connor has published findings showing that enantiornithines had fully modern feathers, clarified the feather arrangements and musculature of several species.

O'Connor was given the Charles Schuchert Award by the Paleontological Society. The award is given annually to a person under 40 whose work reflects excellence and promise in the science of paleontology.

In 2020, O'Connor returned to the United States, becoming the Associate Curator of Fossil Reptiles at the Field Museum in Chicago. She continues to publish, and in 2021 co-authored a paper on the discovery of quartz crystals in the stomach of an enantiornithe. She is also doing research within the Field's collection, studying the mysterious holes in the jaw of Sue the Tyrannosaurus rex.

Further reading

American paleontologists
Women paleontologists
20th-century American scientists
20th-century American women scientists
1983 births
Living people
American academics of Chinese descent
21st-century American women